Millions of Years Ahead of Man is a 1975 West German short documentary film about Leafcutter ants, produced by Manfred Baier for BASF. The music is from Wolfgang Lauth. It was nominated for an Academy Award for Best Documentary Short.

References

External links

1975 films
1975 documentary films
1975 short films
West German films
1970s German-language films
German short documentary films
1970s short documentary films
Documentary films about nature
1970s German films